The 2008 Shakey's V-League (SVL) season was the fifth season of the Shakey's V-League. There were two indoor conferences for this season.

1st Conference 

The Shakey's V-League 5th Season 1st Conference was the seventh conference of Shakey's V-League, a collegiate women's volleyball league in the Philippines founded in 2004. The conference started March 30, 2008 at the Filoil Flying V Centre (formerly The Arena), San Juan.

 Participating teams

Preliminary round

Quarterfinals

Semifinals 

|}

 Match results
 All times are in Philippines Standard Time (UTC+08:00)

|}

Finals 
 3rd place

|}

 Championship

|}

 Final standings 

 Individual awards

2nd Conference 

 Participating teams

Preliminary round

Final round 
 All series are best-of-3

 Final standings 

 Individual awards

References 

2008 in Philippine sport